Peristylus banfieldii, commonly known as the yellow ogre orchid, is a species of orchid that is endemic to Tropical North Queensland. It has between four and six leaves near its base and up to fifty cup-shaped, cream-coloured to yellow flowers on a hairy flowering stem.

Description 
Peristylus banfieldii is a tuberous, perennial herb with between four and six leaves with wavy margins at its base. The lateral sepals are a similar size to the dorsal sepal and spread widely apart from each other. Flowering occurs from January to March.

Taxonomy and naming
The yellow ogre orchid was first formally described in 1906 by Frederick Manson Bailey from a specimen collected on Dunk Island by Edmund James Banfield and given the name Habenaria banfieldii. The description was published in the Queensland Agricultural Journal. In 1981 Bill Lavarack changed the name to Peristylus banfieldii. The specific epithet (banfieldii) honours the collector of the type specimen.

Distribution and habitat
Peristylus banfieldii grows in moist places in open forest and on rainforest margins. It is found on Dunk Island, and near Mareeba and Cardwell.

References

Orchids of Queensland
Endemic orchids of Australia
Plants described in 1906
banfieldii